Llanwrtyd is a small settlement in Powys, mid-Wales, giving its name to a community, in the historic county of Brecknockshire (Breconshire), through which flows the River Irfon.  It lies 1.5 miles north of the town of Llanwrtyd Wells.

Llanwrtyd was historically the centre of a much larger parish which included Llanwrtyd Wells.  The name Llanwrtyd is shared with the ancient parish, and is also sometimes applied to Llanwrtyd Wells (particularly in Welsh). The current community includes Llanwrtyd Wells and Abergwesyn.

Origin of the name
The name Llanwrtyd combines the term for church ("llan") and an otherwise undocumented personal name Gwrtud or Gwrtyd,  but the earliest reference to it "Llanworted" appears only in 1543. It is speculated that the original dedication of the church has been replaced by the present one to the more famous saint in whose diocese it was
during the Middle Ages. The name is more traditionally derived, however, from 'Llanddewi wrth y rhyd' (David's church by the ford). The church is held to have been founded by St David in the 6th century. The curving boundary around the west side of the churchyard and its location beside the river supports the contention that it was established well before the Norman Conquest. The church was classed as a chapel attached to Llangammarch.

History
Llanwrtyd was an ancient parish, a curacy attached to the vicarage of Llangammarch.  The parish church of St David dates from the 11th century and is a Grade II* listed building.

Theophilus Jones, in his A History of the County of Brecknock, was fairly disparaging of the parish; when describing the church he states "there is nothing deserving of notice in this miserable fabric, unless it be an inscription on the wall, to the memory of an old woman of the name of Jones."

In 1740 the curate in the parishes of Llanwrtyd, Llanfihangel Abergwesyn and Llanddewi Abergwesyn, was Wales' most famous hymn-writer William Williams Pantycelyn.

The population in 1801 was about 500 which had risen to 854 by the 1901 census. After the coming of the railway in 1867 the parish played host to at least 12,000 visitors annually to drink the mineral waters at the sulphur springs about a mile and a half down river from the church, and the small town of Llanwrtyd Wells at the springs became the main population centre of the parish. In 1897 the church of St James was built in Llanwrtyd Wells.

Thomas Powel (1845–1922) was born in Llanwrtyd. He became a Welsh Celtic scholar and Professor of Celtic at University College, Cardiff from 1884 to 1918.

The parish became a civil parish (known in English as Llanwrtud),  but in 1871 the civil parish was renamed Llanwrtyd Wells. In 1894 Llanwrtyd Wells Urban District was formed. In 1907 the part of the parish outside the town of Llanwrtyd Wells was separated to form the new civil parish of Llanwrtyd Without.  When civil parishes and urban districts were abolished in Wales in 1974, Llanwrtyd Without and the urban district were reunited to form the community of Llanwrtyd Wells.

References

External links 
Photos of Llanwrtyd and surrounding area on geograph.org.uk

Llanwrtyd Wells
Church parishes in Wales

cy:Llanwrtyd